Student aid can refer to:

 Purely financial aid provided for students that consists of grants or loans or both, usually called student financial aid
 Aid provided for students that consists of more than just purely financial aid, for example work-study programs
Student financial aid (Finland)
Student financial aid (Germany)
Student financial aid (Sweden)
Student financial aid (United States)